, better known as sanodg, is a Japanese video game composer, musician and record producer. He is best known for scoring tracks for the Ridge Racer and Tekken series, as well as Drakengard.

Biography

Early life 
In elementary school, Sano listened to Yellow Magic Orchestra and played Space Invaders, gaining interest in both video games and music. Prior to joining Namco, he had no inclination towards composing video game music, although he did write music with various synths as a hobby. The first synth he bought was a Korg MS-10, while he borrowed other synths from friends as he could not afford those. During his time at university, he studied telecommunication engineering.

Namco (1992–2001) 
After graduating from university in 1992, Sano found two jobs for Korg and Namco. As he felt that the atmosphere of Korg's workplace was stoic and unwelcoming, he settled with a position as a sound designer at Namco. Sano's first project was Zombie Castle, which he created the sound effects for. The following year, he composed the score of Numan Athletics, taking inspiration from techno. Sano also scored "Rare Hero" for Ridge Racer, a series he has composed additional music for since. During his early years at the company, he worked closely with senior composer Shinji Hosoe on several game projects, along with Ayako Saso, Takayuki Aihara and junior composer Hiroto Sasaki. He contributed several tracks to albums on Hosoe's Troubadour Record label and was also a member of his groups, Oriental Magnetic Yellow (OMY) and Manikyua-Dan. OMY was a group parodying Yellow Magic Orchestra, where he was named Ryuichi Sanomoto, parodying Ryuichi Sakamoto.

Following the departure of Hosoe along with co-workers Saso and Aihara who all joined Arika, Sano composed for Tekken 3 in 1997 with Keiichi Okabe. Serving as the sound director, he took a big beat approach to the music with a slower tempo than the music found in previous games, as this genre had not previously been utilized in games. During development, a tester criticized the music and wanted the music to sound closer to Virtua Fighter; this angered Sano, although the report was dismissed. Both composers later worked on the PS1 version, as well as both the arcade and PS2 versions of Tekken Tag Tournament. His final in-house work at Namco was on the unreleased game Starblade: Operation Blue Planet.

Cavia (2001–2010) 
In 2001, Sano left Namco citing unhappiness with its recent developments, and subsequently joined Cavia as a sound director. With Takayuki Aihara, Sano composed Drakengard, which released in 2003. Their goal was to create an experimental soundtrack that reflected the hack-and-slash gameplay and dark atmosphere, as well as the narrative theme of "madness." The music was composed through sampling various shortened pieces of classical music, and was then performed by a full orchestra. Sano and Aihara also sought to emulate the music of Northern Europe. The soundtrack received a mixed reception from users, many of which harshly criticized it for being repetitive and grating. He detailed experiences of reading large volumes of negative comments surrounding the music on 2ch on a daily basis, which was much more than he had initially anticipated. However, it has also been praised for its unconventional approach, especially years after the game was released. As a result of the initial reception, his role in Drakengard 2 was limited to sound direction.

In addition to Drakengard, Sano composed the soundtrack of Resident Evil: Dead Aim, using a synth-heavy score inspired by Goblin. For 2004's Ghost in the Shell: Stand Alone Complex, Sano took inspiration from drum and bass to match the game’s sense of speed. In 2006, Sano released a compilation album titled sanodg works, featuring a selection of tracks he considers to be his best. While the album was originally planned to include his work on the Ridge Racer and Tekken series, legal issues prevented their inclusion. The same year, he produced a collaborative album with the company Melody Clip, titled FM Sound Module Maniax, featuring tracks from various video game composers written with FM synthesis. Ringtone versions were also distributed on Melody Clip free of charge.

Sano designed and produced KORG DS-10 for Nintendo DS. He formed a trio of the same name consisting of himself, Yasunori Mitsuda and Michio Okamiya in order to promote the program. The three had spoken about their interest in creating a synthesizer for the DS; Korg approved of this idea. He intended it to be used for any genre the user desired to create music in, rather than a particular genre like chiptune or techno. He also chose to model the synth on the Korg MS-10 as he bought this synth during his teenage years, and also felt that the DS vaguely resembled the synth.

Detune (2010–present) 
Following Cavia's disbandment, Sano established Detune, a music software production company in May 6, 2010. Detune developed a follow-up to KORG DS-10 titled KORG M01, intended as a DS version of the Korg M1 synth. In 2012, Detune released iYM2151, a music program for the iPad based on the Yamaha YM2151 sound chip. In the same year, Sano composed "Algorithm" for the game Orgarythm using iYM2151. The following year, a Nintendo 3DS eShop version of KORG M01 was released worldwide, titled KORG M01D. In 2014, he released a compilation album titled sanodg's arcade game music works, which features the soundtracks of four arcade games he worked on during his time at Namco. During 2016 to 2017 he created a series of EDM-styled albums with Hiroyoshi Kato, the first of which was titled EDM IS GAME.

Works

Video games

Anime

References

1969 births
Japanese composers
Japanese male composers
Japanese record producers
Japanese techno musicians
Living people
Musicians from Shizuoka Prefecture
Video game composers